Sredorek may refer to:

Antarctica
Sredorek Peak

Bulgaria
Sredorek, Kyustendil Province

North Macedonia
Sredorek (region)
Sredorek, Dolneni, a village
Sredorek (Roma neighbourhood), in Kumanovo